Florian Müller may refer to:

 Florian Müller (author) (born 1970), German author, entrepreneur, blogger, lobbyist, and business consultant
 Florian Müller (footballer, born 1986), German footballer
 Florian Müller (footballer, born 1997), German footballer
 Florian Müller (politician), member of the Bundestag